The Gentlemen is a 1965 West German comedy-drama film directed by Franz Seitz, Rolf Thiele and Alfred Weidenmann and starring Paul Hubschmid, Mario Adorf, and Susy Andersen.

Plot 
The focus of the plot is the young journalist Evelyne. The young lady already has a multi-faceted past and has gotten to know quite a few men – from simple boys to extremely wealthy manufacturers. Bored with her job, at the suggestion of a dynamic publisher named Blech, whom she meets at a conference of various writers and other intellectuals in Travemünde, she begins to write down her amorous adventures of the past, hoping to land a raunchy literary sensation. She also ends up in bed with sheet metal. She becomes pregnant by him, but Blech leaves her. In the following episodes, Evelyne looks back on her life and reviews her affairs.  

Early on, Evelyne shows herself to be a precocious fruit when she flirts with the slightly older farm boy Boris during a wedding in the country. As a young woman, she begins an affair with a much older colonel in the US occupying army. This love affair also falls apart, and Evelyne ends up in the arms of a jaded young aristocrat, a veritable count. But this affair also has no future, and so the blonde siren finally flees into the arms and bed of the staid Swiss watch manufacturer Pflügeli. Although he is willing and a true gentleman, his sexual virility leaves much to be desired.

Cast
Paul Hubschmid as Pflügeli
...and, in alphabetical order:

References

External links

West German films
German comedy-drama films
1965 comedy-drama films
Films directed by Rolf Thiele
Films directed by Alfred Weidenmann
German anthology films
1960s German-language films
1960s German films